Yuriy Oleksandrovych Slavik (born 6 May 1989) is a Ukrainian professional footballer who plays as a goalkeeper for Ukrainian club Uzhhorod.

References

External links
 
 
 
 Profile at sportnet.sk

1989 births
Living people
Sportspeople from Uzhhorod
Ukrainian footballers
Association football goalkeepers
FC Hoverla Uzhhorod players
ŠK Futura Humenné players
FK Humenné players
FC Uzhhorod players
Ukrainian First League players
Ukrainian Amateur Football Championship players
3. Liga (Slovakia) players
4. Liga (Slovakia) players
5. Liga players
Ukrainian expatriate footballers
Expatriate footballers in Slovakia
Ukrainian expatriate sportspeople in Slovakia
Expatriate footballers in Hungary
Ukrainian expatriate sportspeople in Hungary